A town hall is the headquarters of a town or city's administration.

Town Hall may also refer to:

Australia
 Adelaide Town Hall, South Australia
 Melbourne Town Hall, Victoria
 Perth Town Hall, Western Australia
 St Kilda Town Hall, Melbourne
 Town Hall railway station, Melbourne
 Sydney Town Hall, New South Wales
 Town Hall railway station, Sydney

Brazil
 Town Hall (Santo Amaro), Bahia

Estonia
 Tallinn Town Hall

India
 Town Hall, Coimbatore, Tamil Nadu
 Town Hall, Mangalore, Karnataka
 Bangalore Town Hall, Karnataka
 C V Rangacharlu Memorial Hall or Mysore Town Hall, Karnataka

Lithuania
 Town Hall, Kaunas
 Town Hall, Vilnius

Malaysia
 Town Hall, Penang, George Town

Netherlands
 Town Hall, De Rijp

Poland
 Town Hall (Orneta), Warmia

Sri Lanka
 Town Hall, Colombo

United Kingdom
 Birmingham Town Hall, England
 Brighton Town Hall, England
 Cowbridge Town Hall, Wales
 Hove Town Hall, England
 Leeds Town Hall, England
 Liverpool Town Hall, England
 Manchester Town Hall, England
 Sheffield Town Hall, England
 Sutton Coldfield Town Hall, Birmingham, England

United States

 Town Hall Arts Center, Littleton, Colorado
 Town Hall (Westport, Connecticut), a former town hall
 Town Hall (Castle Hall), Zionsville, Indiana
 Town Hall (Lakeville, Massachusetts)
 Town Hall (Sandwich, New Hampshire)
 The Town Hall (New York City), a performing arts venue
 Town Hall Seattle, a performance space in Seattle, Washington

Other uses 
 "Town Hall" (Superstore), a 2018 television episode
 Town Hall, 1962, a 1965 album by Ornette Coleman
 Town Hall 1972, a 1972 album by Anthony Braxton
 Townhall, an American politically conservative website
 Town hall meeting, a discussion

See also
 
 
 Town Hall Theatre (disambiguation)
 Town meeting, a form of direct democracy